David Foster (1929 – December 23, 2019) was an American film producer, with credits in films such as The Thing (1982), The Mask of Zorro (1998) and The Core (2003).

Early life
Foster was born in 1929 in The Bronx, New York City. His parents were Jewish immigrants from Poland. He moved to California in 1946 at age 17, and graduated from USC School of Cinema - Television in 1953.

Career

Early career 
Foster began his career as a publicist for Rogers & Cowan, representing top tier talent including Steve McQueen, Shirley MacLaine, Peter Sellers and Sonny and Cher. He then became a partner at Allan, Foster, Ingersoll and Weber. He produced his first film, McCabe & Mrs. Miller, in 1971.

Filmography

Personal life and death
Foster married Jackie Pattiz in 1959, and they had three sons: Gary, Greg, and Tim. Gary followed in his father's footsteps, producing the TV series Community. Tim also produced two films in the late 1990s, and Greg was the former CEO of IMAX.

David Foster died on December 23, 2019, in Los Angeles, California, at age 90.

References

1929 births
2019 deaths
American people of Polish-Jewish descent
People from the Bronx
People from Los Angeles
American military personnel of the Korean War
American film producers